Len Fenton (29 January 1929 – 8 May 2007) was an Australian sailor. He competed in the Star event at the 1948 Summer Olympics.

References

External links
 

1929 births
2007 deaths
Australian male sailors (sport)
Olympic sailors of Australia
Sailors at the 1948 Summer Olympics – Star
Place of birth missing